The National Pest Technicians Association is a professional trade association for pest control companies in the UK, with over 850 total memberships. Pests concerned with include rodents, certain vertebrate pests (including grey squirrels, urban foxes and rabbits, all designated bird pests (e.g. feral pigeons, corvids, certain specified seagulls) and public health insect pests (e.g. bed bugs, fleas, cockroaches, stored product moths and beetles).

History
It was formed in June 1993 to provide a forum and platform to help and assist professional pest control technicians and their respective servicing companies to undertake their responsibilities safely.

Structure
The association has its offices and administration centre in the village of Kinoulton between Nottingham and Melton Mowbray in the Vale of Belvoir in south Nottinghamshire.

References

External links
 NPTA Main Website including Aims and Objectives
 British Pest Control Association (BPCA)

Audio clips
 Today Programme February 2009

Trade associations based in the United Kingdom
Organisations based in Nottinghamshire
Organizations established in 1993
Pest control organizations
Rushcliffe